Eupithecia peguensis is a moth in the family Geometridae. It is found in Nepal, Thailand, Vietnam (Upper Tonkin) and Myanmar.

References

Moths described in 1958
peguensis
Moths of Asia